Symbhav
is the annual culfest of Symbiosis Law School, Pune. It is a three-day-long event, organised entirely by the students of Symbiosis Law School, Pune, and is held towards the latter half of February every year. It attracts more than 5000 students each year from all across India as well as other countries. Started in 2009, Symbhav, in its 9th edition, became the largest college fest in Pune. Symbhav embodies a new theme every year, and the 10th edition will be held from 23 to 25 February 2018, at the new Symbiosis Law School, Pune campus in Viman Nagar, Pune  with the theme being "Global Village".

History 
Symbhav was first held in 2009, with a participation index of about 75 colleges, 4 international and 10 national universities. Every subsequent Symbhav has attracted significantly larger audience, drawing over 6000 people, including students and professionals. Over the years, Symbhav has attracted considerable media attention and well-known sponsors from Pune and other parts of the country.

Over the years, Symbhav has incorporated varied themes; "Go Green", "Carnival of Change", "Essentially Desi", "Brave New World" have been some of its previous chapters. Symbhav '12 saw the scope of the fest broaden in numbers, attendees and events, as Symbhav took on a social initiative for the first time. Since then, Symbhav has been a fest with a cause championing the rights of those unable to speak for themselves. Being a law school fest, Symbhav also organizes a host of legal events under the banner of Professor Emeritus, Advocate Ram Jethmalani. With the ambitious theme for 2015, "RetroFuturism", Symbhav hosted upwards of 40 events, its largest set of events.

Pronites 
The Pronites, or the nights when artistes perform, have been a major factor in attracting students to be a part of the fest. Over the years, Symbhav Pronite has featured popular musicians have performed at Symbhav including the contemporary fusion music band Indian Ocean in 2009; the rock and roll band Parikrama in 2010; Junkyard Groove, Jalebee Cartel, Them Clones, Advaita, Advaita, Avial, Agnee, Cyanide, Navin Kumar, Niladri Kumar; Nucleya, Inner Sanctum, Colour Compound and Agam in 2013, and Lost Stories, Bombay Bassment and Mangnayar Trippin' in 2014.

Events 

Symbhav features a wide variety of events ranging from quizzes, debates, legal events to sports, theatre, music and fine arts events.

References

Further reading

CBS Interactive Business Network
News Axis
Chalo Campus, Indian Education Blog
Law Et Al News
KnowAFest 
Legal Events
Literary Events
Cultural and Performing Arts
Fine Arts Events
Sports Events
DNA India

External links 
 Official Website
 Official Instagram Page
 Symbiosis Law School
 Official Facebook Page

Culfests